Schefflera cephalotes is a species of plant in the family Araliaceae. It is found in Malaysia and Singapore.

References

cephalotes
Endangered plants
Taxonomy articles created by Polbot